La Isla Bonita is the twelfth studio album by American rock band Deerhoof. Produced by former music journalist and Mr. Dream drummer Nick Sylvester, it was released on November 4, 2014 through Polyvinyl Record Co.

The track "Exit Only" was released as the first single off the album on August 20, 2014. On September 10, 2014, Deerhoof shared the second track "Paradise Girls". The band embarked on a tour in support of the album in November 2014.

Background
The album's recording started when Deerhoof tried to write a track similar to their live cover of Ramones’ "Pinhead", which resulted in  the track "Exit Only". Demo tracks were recorded for a week at guitarist Ed Rodriguez’s home in Oregon and sent to Nick Sylvester, who eventually produced the album. The album draws upon a wide array of influences, including Radiohead, The Flaming Lips, Lou Reed, Sonic Youth, Beck, the Roots, Ric Ocasek, David Byrne, Janet Jackson, and Madonna, with the album's title being a reference to Madonna's "La Isla Bonita".

On the same press release, drummer Greg Saunier stated:

Critical reception

La Isla Bonita received positive reviews from music critics. At Metacritic, which assigns a normalized rating out of 100 to reviews from critics, the album received an average score of 77, which indicates "generally positive reviews", based on 27 reviews. AllMusic critic Heather Phares regarded the record as "another fine example of how the band changes course on almost every album" and wrote: "they've been able to put different but cohesive spins on their sound so well, and for so long, is truly remarkable."

Track listing
 "Paradise Girls" — 3:35
 "Mirror Monster" — 2:39
 "Doom" — 3:20
 "Last Fad" — 3:03
 "Tiny Bubbles" — 3:28
 "Exit Only" — 2:45
 "Big House Waltz" — 3:27
 "God 2" — 1:43
 "Black Pitch" — 3:24
 "Oh Bummer" — 4:25

Personnel
Deerhoof
 Satomi Matsuzaki
 John Dieterich
 Ed Rodriguez
 Greg Saunier

Technical personnel
 Nick Sylvester – production

References

2014 albums
Deerhoof albums
Polyvinyl Record Co. albums